The 2020–21 WABA League was the 20th season of the Adriatic League. Competition included eight teams from five countries. In this season participating clubs from Serbia,  Montenegro, Bosnia and Herzegovina, Bulgaria and Slovenia.

Vojvodina 021 informed the Board of the WABA League 23 february 2021 that due to obligations in the national championship and the Serbian Cup, it is not able to play the remaining seven games of the 2020-21 WABA League regular season. It means that Vojvodina 021 withdraws from the 2020-21 WABA League.

As per the Official Basketball Rules, the games (played and unplayed) were awarded to their respective opponents with a score of 20-0. Furthermore, the forfeiting team Vojvodina 021 will receive 0 classification points in the standings.

Teams

Team allocation

Venues and locations

Regular season

In the Regular season was played with 8 teams and play a dual circuit system, each with each one game at home and away. The four best teams at the end of the regular season were placed in the Final Four. The regular season began on 14 October 2020 and it will end on 4 March 2021.

Standings

Final Four

The Final Four was held on 20 and 21 March 2021 in Stara Zagora.

Awards
Final Four MVP: Jaklin Zlatanova (190-PF-88) of  Beroe
Player of the Year: Mina Đorđević (188-PF-99) of  Budućnost Bemax
Guard of the Year: Matea Tavić (178-G-92) of  Beroe
Forward of Year: Mina Đorđević (188-PF-99) of  Budućnost Bemax
Center of the Year: Jaklin Zlatanova (190-PF-88) of  Beroe
Newcomer of the Year: Dragana Domuzin (174-PG-00) of  Orlovi
Most Improved Player of Year: Mojca Jelenc (200-PF-03) of  Cinkarna Celje
Defensive Player of Year: Sarah Boothe (195-F/C-90) of  Beroe
Coach of the Year: Tatyana Gateva of  Beroe

1st Team
Matea Tavić (178-G-92) of  Beroe
Dragana Domuzin (174-PG-00) of  Orlovi
Isabela Lyra (180-F-94) of  Montana 2003
Mina Đorđević (188-PF-99) of  Budućnost Bemax
Jaklin Zlatanova (190-PF-88) of  Beroe

2nd Team
Snežana Aleksić (173-G-89) of  Montana 2003
Snežana Bogićević (183-SG-97) of  Cinkarna Celje
Tamara Rajić (182-G/F-93) of  Orlovi
Patricia Bura (188-C-96) of  Budućnost Bemax
 Sarah Boothe (195-F/C-90) of  Beroe

Honorable Mention
Radostina Dimitrova (181-SF-94) of  Beroe
Dragana Živković (183-G-01) of  Budućnost Bemax
Dimana Georgieva (188-F/C-88) of  Montana 2003
Vladinka Erak (192-C-84) of  Orlovi

All-Defensive Team
 Victoria Stoycheva (165-PG-92) of  Montana 2003
 Blaža Čeh (181-PG-03) of  Cinkarna Celje
 Isabela Lyra (180-F-94) of  Montana 2003
 Patricia Bura (180-C-96) of  Budućnost Bemax
 Sarah Boothe (195-F/C-90) of  Beroe

All-Newcomers Team
 Blaža Čeh (181-PG-03) of  Cinkarna Celje 
Dragana Domuzin (174-PG-00) of  Orlovi
 Yana Karamfilova (175-F-05) of  Beroe
 Sara Garić (183-F-03)  Cinkarna Celje
 Jite Gbemuotor (188-F-04)  Cinkarna Celje

See also
 2020–21 ABA League First Division
 2020–21 First Women's Basketball League of Serbia

References

External links
 Official website
 Profile at eurobasket.com

 
2020-21
2020–21 in European women's basketball leagues
2020–21 in Serbian basketball
2020–21 in Slovenian basketball
2020–21 in Bulgarian basketball
2020–21 in Bosnia and Herzegovina basketball
2020–21 in Montenegrin basketball